Calliostoma scotti, common name Scott's top shell, is a species of sea snail, a marine gastropod mollusk in the family Calliostomatidae.

Some authors place this taxon in the subgenus Calliostoma (Kombologion)

Description
The size of the shell varies between 25 mm and 40 mm.

Distribution
This species occurs in the Indian Ocean between Somalia and South Africa.

References

 Kilburn, R. N. 1973. Notes on some benthic Mollusca from Natal and Moçambique with descriptions of new species and subspecies of Calliostoma, Solariella, Latiaxis, Babylonia, Fusinus, Bathytoma and Conus. Annals of the Natal Museum 21(3):557–578, 1 fig, 1
 Rosenberg, G. 1992. Encyclopedia of Seashells. Dorset: New York. 224 pp. page(s): 3

External links
 

scotti
Gastropods described in 1973